Asadabad-e Khurin (also Romanized as Asadābād-e Khūrīn; also known as Asadābād, Ḩūrīn, and Khūreh) is a village in Ilat-e Qaqazan-e Gharbi Rural District, Kuhin District, Qazvin County, Qazvin Province, Iran. At the 2006 census, its population was 86, in 17 families.

References 

Populated places in Qazvin County